The Trogkofel Formation is a geologic formation in Austria, Slovenia and Italy. It preserves fossils dating back to the Sakmarian to Artinskian stages of the Permian period.

Fossil content 
The following fossils were reported from the formation:

 Alternifenestella subquadratopora
 Alternifenestella tuberculifera
 Biwaella aff. americana
 Boultonia willsi
 Carnocladia fasciculata
 Eridopora ignota
 Filites trapezoida
 Neostreptognathodus cf. pequopensis
 Polypora sigillata
 Primorella serena
 Pseudofusulina ex gr. fusiformis
 Rhabdomeson hirtum
 Robustoschwagerina spatiosa
 Scacchinella gigantea
 Schubertella paramelonica
 Spirifer (Martinia) macilentus
 Stenophragmidium lamellatum
 Streblotrypa (Streblascopora) germana
 Yokoyamaella (Yokoyamaella) arminiae
 Alternifenestella sp.
 Apterinella sp.
 Dutkevitchia sp.
 Epimastopora sp.
 Eridopora sp.
 Girvanella sp.
 Goniocladia sp.
 Paraptylopora sp.
 Paratriticites sp.
 Penniretepora sp.
 Prismopora sp.
 Pseudofusulina sp.
 Rhombopora sp.
 Rugosofusulina sp.
 Staffella sp.
 Tubiphytes sp.

Flora
 Eugonophyllum johnsoni
 Shamovella obscura
 Anchicodium sp.
 Darvasites sp.
 Ivanovia sp.

See also 
 List of fossiliferous stratigraphic units in Austria
 List of fossiliferous stratigraphic units in Italy
 List of fossiliferous stratigraphic units in Slovenia

References

Bibliography 
 H. C. Forke. 2002. Biostratigraphic subdivision and correlation of uppermost Carboniferous/Lower Permian sediments in the southern Alps: fusulinoidean and conodont faunas from the Carnic Alps (Austria/Italy), Karavanke Mountains (Slovenia), and southern Urals (Russia). Facies 47:201-275 
 A. Ernst. 2000. Permian Bryozoans of the NW-Tethys. Facies 43:79-102
 A. Ramovs. 1986. Reef building organisms and reefs in the Permian of Slovenia, NW Yugoslavia. Memorie della Societa Geologica Italiana 34:189-193
 H. L. Holzer and A. Ramovs. 1979. New rugose corals from the Lower Permian beds of the Karavanke Alps. Geologija 22(1):1-20
 E. Schellwien. 1900. Die Fauna der Trogkofelschichten in den Karnischen Alpen und den Karawanken I. Theil: die Brachiopoden. Abhandlungen der Kaiserlich-Königlichen Geologischen Reichsanstalt 16:1-122

Geologic formations of Austria
Geologic formations of Italy
Geologic formations of Slovenia
Permian System of Europe
Permian Austria
Permian Italy
Limestone formations
Reef deposits
Permian northern paleotropical deposits
Southern Limestone Alps